Ulrich Darmel Kapolongo Zaolo Desuza (born 31 July 1989, in Brazzaville) is a Congolese footballer player who last played for Al-Khaleej as a striker. He has been capped by Congo at international level.

Playing career

Club

Qarabağ
In July 2013 Kapolongo signed for Azerbaijan Premier League side Qarabağ from Jordan Premier League side Shabab Al-Ordon on a two-year contract.

Kapolongo made his debut for Qarabağ in the UEFA Europa League 1st Qualifying round 2nd leg match against Metalurg Skopje. coming on as a second-half substitute for Nikoloz Gelashvili. His first goal for Qarabağ came two games later, again in the Europa League, in extra time against Piast Gliwice. Kapolongo secured a 2-2 draw for Qarabağ which meant they went through as 4-3 winners to the 3rd qualifying round. Kapolongo went on to make his league debut on 11 August 2013 in a 5-1 victory over Sumgayit, again coming on as a second-half substitute for Gelashvili.

FK Teplice
On 25 July 2014, Kapolongo signed for Czech First League team FK Teplice.

International
Kapolongo made his national team debut on 27 March 2011 against Ghana in a 2012 Africa Cup of Nations qualification, coming on as a substitute for Jean-Claude Mpassy. Kapolongo then had to wait two-years for his second cap, which came on 14 August 2013 against Tunisia in a 3-0 friendly defeat in which Kapolongo was replaced by Dzon Delarge in the 77th minute. His first goal for The Congo came on 7 September 2013, his third game for his country, in the 2014 FIFA World Cup qualification match against Niger.

Career statistics

Club

International

Statistics accurate as of match played 7 September 2013

International goals
Scores and results list Congo's goal tally first.

Honours

Club
Shabab Al-Ordon
Jordan Premier League (1) - 2012–13
Qarabağ
Azerbaijan Premier League (1) - 2013–14

References

External links
 
 

1989 births
Living people
Republic of the Congo footballers
Republic of the Congo expatriate footballers
Association football forwards
Republic of the Congo international footballers
Expatriate footballers in Azerbaijan
CARA Brazzaville players
Qarabağ FK players
Shabab Al-Ordon Club players
Khaleej FC players
Expatriate footballers in Jordan
Expatriate footballers in the Czech Republic
Expatriate footballers in Saudi Arabia
People from Bertoua
Sportspeople from Brazzaville
ACNFF players
Saudi First Division League players
Republic of the Congo expatriate sportspeople in Azerbaijan
Republic of the Congo expatriate sportspeople in Jordan
Republic of the Congo expatriate sportspeople in the Czech Republic
Republic of the Congo expatriate sportspeople in Saudi Arabia